The Brunsberg is a  high hill on the northwestern edge of the Lüneburg Heath in northern Germany. It lies in the Brunsberg Nature Reserve, reserve no. From its summit, covered with heather and grazed by moorland sheep, there is a good view over the neighbouring heaths and in good visibility the Wilseder Berg, and Heidepark at Soltau can be seen to the south. To the southwest the tower of St. John's Church (Johanneskirche) can be seen in Tostedt. The view towards Hamburg is blocked by the Harburg Hills. Not far from the top is the holiday home for the youth organisation Deutsche Schreberjugend Landesverband Hamburg eV.

Hills of Lower Saxony